Harold Arthur Watkinson, 1st Viscount Watkinson,  (25 January 1910, in Walton on Thames – 19 December 1995, in Bosham) was a British businessman and Conservative Party politician. He was Minister of Transport and Civil Aviation between 1955 and 1959 and a cabinet member as Minister of Defence between 1959 and 1962, when he was sacked in the Night of the Long Knives. In 1964 he was ennobled as Viscount Watkinson.

Education and early life
Educated at Queen's College, Taunton, and at King's College London, Watkinson worked for the family engineering business between 1929 and 1935 and in technical and engineering journalism between 1935 and 1939. He saw active service as a Lieutenant-Commander in the Royal Naval Volunteer Reserve during the Second World War.

Political career
Watkinson was elected Member of Parliament (MP) for the new constituency of Woking, Surrey in 1950, holding the seat until 1964, and was initially Parliamentary Private Secretary (PPS) to the Minister of Transport and Civil Aviation, John Maclay, from 1951 to 1952. He became a government member under Winston Churchill as Parliamentary Secretary to the Ministry of Labour and National Service in 1952, a post he held until December 1955, when he was made Minister of Transport and Civil Aviation by Sir Anthony Eden, entering the cabinet in January 1957, and remaining there when promoted to Minister of Defence under Harold Macmillan in 1959. Watkinson was one of seven cabinet ministers sacked in July 1962 in Macmillan's Night of the Long Knives. He was appointed a Privy Counsellor in 1955, a Companion of Honour in 1962, and raised to the peerage as Viscount Watkinson, of Woking in the County of Surrey, in 1964.

Business career
Lord Watkinson held a number of public and business appointments, including senior positions in the British Institute of Management; President of the Confederation of British Industry between 1976 and 1977; and Chairman of Cadbury Schweppes Ltd between 1969 and 1974.

Personal life
Watkinson had been an active rock climber in his younger days. He married Vera (Peggy) Langmead in 1939 and they had two daughters. Lord Watkinson died in December 1995, aged 85, and the viscountcy became extinct.

Arms

References

1910 births
1995 deaths
Alumni of King's College London
Conservative Party (UK) MPs for English constituencies
Members of the Order of the Companions of Honour
Members of the Privy Council of the United Kingdom
Ministers in the Eden government, 1955–1957
Ministers in the Macmillan and Douglas-Home governments, 1957–1964
Ministers in the third Churchill government, 1951–1955
People educated at Queen's College, Taunton
Royal Naval Volunteer Reserve personnel of World War II
Royal Navy officers
Secretaries of State for Defence (UK)
Secretaries of State for Transport (UK)
UK MPs 1950–1951
UK MPs 1951–1955
UK MPs 1955–1959
UK MPs 1959–1964
UK MPs who were granted peerages
Viscounts created by Elizabeth II